The Grand Prix van Hasselt is a cyclo-cross race held in Hasselt, Belgium, which was part of the BPost Bank Trophy until 2014 but has since become part of the Soudal Classics.

Past winners

Men

Women

References 
 Results

Cycle races in Belgium
Cyclo-cross races
Recurring sporting events established in 2005
2005 establishments in Belgium
Annual events in Belgium
Sport in Hasselt
Autumn events in Belgium